Oliver St John (c. 1598–1673) was an English statesman and judge.

Oliver St John may also refer to:

Oliver St John, 1st Baron St John of Bletso (1522–1582), English peer
Oliver St John, 3rd Baron St John of Bletso (1540–1618), English politician
Oliver St John, 1st Viscount Grandison (1559–1630), English soldier and Lord Deputy of Ireland
Oliver St John, 1st Earl of Bolingbroke (c. 1580–1646), English nobleman and politician
Oliver St John, 5th Baron St John of Bletso (1603–1642), his son, English politician
Oliver St John (civil servant) (1837–1891), administrator in British India
Oliver St John, Viscount Kirkwall (born 1969), member of the Scottish aristocracy
Oliver St John, 2nd Earl of Bolingbroke (before 1634–1688), British peer and landowner

See also
Peter St John, 9th Earl of Orkney (born Oliver Peter St John, 1938), Canadian academic and Scottish peer